Bukayo Ayoyinka T. M. Saka (born 5 September 2001) is an English professional footballer who plays as a right winger, right-back or midfielder for  club Arsenal and the England national team. Saka is known for his attacking incisiveness and creativity, and is often considered one of the best young football players in the world.

Saka has spent his entire first-team club career with Arsenal, where he has won an FA Cup and an FA Community Shield, progressively becoming one of Arsenal's most prolific and influential players. Following the 2020–21 and 2021–22 seasons, he was named as Arsenal's player of the season.

Saka represented England at various youth levels before making his debut for the senior team in October 2020. He was part of England's squad at the UEFA Euro 2020, and represented the nation at the 2022 FIFA World Cup.

Early life
Saka was born in Ealing, Greater London, to Yoruba Nigerian parents, Adenike and Yomi Saka, and was the younger of two children. He attended Edward Betham Church of England Primary School before Greenford High School, where he gained high grades in his GCSEs, achieving four A*s and three As. Prior to joining Arsenal, Saka played youth football for local club Greenford Celtic. His parents emigrated to London from Nigeria as economic migrants. In an interview, Saka stated the importance of his father, Yomi, in his footballing career: "He's a massive inspiration for me. From when I was young, he always kept me grounded, kept me humble."

His name "Bukayo" originates from the Yoruba language spoken in southern Nigeria, meaning "adds to happiness".

Club career

Arsenal

Early career
Having previously played for youth teams of Watford, Saka joined Arsenal's Hale End academy at the age of seven. 

In a 2020 interview Arsenal U16 coach Trevor Bumstead stated; "Bukayo always stood out in the younger teams. He was a fantastic decision maker.  He knew when to beat people and when to pass, as well as having brilliant physical attributes and really good character and personality." Once he turned 17 years old, Saka was given a professional contract by Arsenal and promoted to the under-23 side. 

On 29 November 2018, Saka made his first-team debut for Arsenal in their UEFA Europa League match against Vorskla Poltava, he came on as a 68th minute substitute for Aaron Ramsey. On 13 December, Saka made his first full home debut for Arsenal in their Europa League match against Qarabağ. On 1 January 2019, Saka made his debut in the Premier League in a 4–1 win against Fulham after coming on for Alex Iwobi in the 83rd minute. He became the first player born in 2001 to play in a Premier League match.

2019–20: Breakthrough and FA Cup win
Saka scored his first goal on 19 September, curling a fine effort from long range into the corner away to German side Eintracht Frankfurt in the Europa League. He finished the match with two assists also to his name in a 3–0 win. Saka was rewarded for his efforts in Germany with his first Premier League start, in a 3–2 home win over Aston Villa. He then registered an assist for Pierre-Emerick Aubameyang, setting up Arsenal's equaliser in a 1–1 draw at Old Trafford against Manchester United.

Following injuries to Sead Kolašinac and Kieran Tierney, Saka began to establish himself as a regular in the Arsenal first team at left-back. On 27 January 2020, he scored the opening goal in Arsenal's 2–1 FA Cup fourth round victory at AFC Bournemouth after finishing a 22-pass move, as well as assisting the second goal, scored by Eddie Nketiah. The goal was later voted goal of the round by BBC Sport. After a two-week mid-season break, Saka marked his return to action at home to Newcastle United with an assist for Nicolas Pépé's goal. He then set up Alexandre Lacazette for his ninth assist of the season in a 1–0 win at Olympiacos in the Europa League. He then hit double figures for assists that season after crossing in for Nketiah in a thrilling 3–2 home win against Everton. Additional strong performances against Portsmouth and West Ham United further strengthened his grip in the first team.

On 1 July 2020, Saka signed a new long-term contract with Arsenal. Head coach Mikel Arteta praised Saka and said: "I think he represents every value that this football club stands for. He has come through the academy, and earned his respect with hard work and accountability and you can see the progression that he is having as a player but as well as a person." On 4 July 2020 he scored his first Premier League goal for the club against Wolverhampton Wanderers, with a half volley beating goalkeeper Rui Patrício, in a 2–0 win. He was an unused substitute as Arsenal defeated Chelsea 2–1 to win their 14th FA Cup. He came third in the vote for the Arsenal Player of the Season award in the 2019–20 season.

2020–21: Arsenal Player of the Season
On 29 August 2020, Saka was in the starting 11 and registered an assist for Pierre-Emerick Aubameyang in the 2020 FA Community Shield, in which 2019–20 FA Cup winners Arsenal clinched a 5–4 penalty shoot-out victory over 2019–20 Premier League winners Liverpool, after the match was 1–1 after 90 minutes. Saka opened his account for the 2020–21 season on 4 October, scoring in a 2–1 victory against Sheffield United at the Emirates Stadium.
On 8 November, Saka turned in Matt Targett’s cross and scored an unfortunate own goal in a 0-3 home defeat against Aston Villa.

On Boxing Day 2020, he scored on his 40th Premier League appearance for Arsenal in a 3–1 home win over Chelsea. Due to his stellar performances in the December 2020 month, he was later voted as the Arsenal Player of the Month on the Arsenal official website. He was voted as the Player of the Month again in January, having scored three goals and provided one assist in six appearances across all competitions, in which his goal against West Bromwich Albion was voted as the runner-up of Arsenal's Goal of the Month. Saka was named Player of the Month for the third time in February after contributing one goal and two assists, claiming 48 per cent of the votes.

On 6 March 2021, Saka made his 50th Premier League appearance for Arsenal in a 1–1 away draw at Burnley; he is the second youngest player in club history to reach that milestone. On 15 April, Saka scored a goal and helped Arsenal to a 4–0 victory over Slavia Prague in the quarter final of the Europa League. After his fine performance, he was named as the Europa League Player of the Week. He finished the season with seven goals and seven assists in 46 appearances across all competitions, as he was voted Arsenal Player of the Season, having come in third the previous campaign. He also was named in the shortlist for the PFA Young Player of the Season, but this was won by Manchester City’s Phil Foden.

2021–22: Club top scorer, second Arsenal Player of the Season
Saka scored his first goal of the new campaign in a 6–0 EFL Cup second round win away to West Bromwich Albion at The Hawthorns in late August. He scored his first Premier League goal of the season in September against Tottenham Hotspur at the Emirates Stadium, whilst also providing an assist for Emile Smith Rowe’s goal in a 3–1 win. On 30 October, Saka made his 100th appearance for Arsenal, marking the occasion with an assist in a 2–0 away win at Leicester City. On 26 December, Saka scored his first brace as Arsenal beat Norwich City 5–0 at Carrow Road. In doing so, Saka became the second youngest player, after Nicolas Anelka, to score 10 Premier League goals for Arsenal.

Arsenal finished fifth in the Premier League, falling short of UEFA Champions League qualification for the following season. After Arsenal's 2–0 away defeat to Newcastle United, which all but confirmed the club's Champions League absence, Saka criticised his own "poor performance", and expressed his disappointment over the game, saying "we have had those opportunities to win and put ourselves in a great position, but we could not do that". After finishing the season as the club's top scorer, he was nominated for the Premier League Player of the Season, Premier League Young Player of the Season and PFA Young Player of the Year. Saka was named Arsenal's player of the season for a second consecutive season, becoming the first person to retain the award since Thierry Henry won in 2003 and again in 2004.

2022–23: Title challengers
Saka has played a pivotal role for Arsenal, scoring some crucial goals as the Gunners aim to win their first league title since 2003–04. He made his 100th Premier League appearance in the 3–0 win at Bournemouth on 20 August 2022, becoming the second youngest Arsenal player to reach that milestone. On 9 October, he scored twice as Arsenal beat Liverpool 3–2, including the winning goal from the penalty spot in the 76th minute. That result put Arsenal on top of the table, where they would stay until mid-February. Saka scored Arsenal's second as they came from behind to beat Manchester United 3–2 on 22 January 2023, with his goal winning Arsenal's Goal of the Month award for January. He scored Arsenal's first equaliser against Aston Villa on 18 February, as they came from behind twice to win 4–2 at Villa Park. That win put Arsenal back on top, having been knocked off by Manchester City earlier in the week.

On 13 March, Saka won the Men's Young Player of the Year award at the 2023 London Football Awards.

International career

Youth career
Saka represented England at under-16, under-17, under-18, under-19 and under-21 level.

In May 2018, he was included in the England under-17 squad as they hosted the 2018 UEFA European Under-17 Championship. The hosts were eliminated by the Netherlands at the semi-final stage on a penalty shoot-out, although Saka scored his spot kick.

In September 2018, Saka scored the winner for the England under-18 team in an away game against France. In November, Saka received his first call-up to the England under-19 team. He scored on his debut at that age level in a 2019 UEFA European Under-19 Championship qualifier against Moldova.

Senior career
On 4 September 2020, Saka made his debut for the England under-21 team during a 6–0 victory away to Kosovo. On 1 October, Saka was called up to the England senior squad for the first time, and made his international debut as one of the starters in a 3–0 victory over Wales. Having played four times for England, Saka is now tied to England internationally and can no longer represent Nigeria.

On 1 June 2021, he was named in the 26-man squad for UEFA Euro 2020. On 2 June, in a friendly against Austria, Saka scored his first senior international goal, the only goal in a 1–0 win. He started in England's third Euro 2020 group stage match on 22 June against the Czech Republic, and was named the man of the match. On 11 July, in the tournament final against Italy, Saka was brought on as a substitute for Kieran Trippier. Following full time and extra time, Saka was chosen to take the team's fifth penalty during the subsequent shoot-out, his first penalty kick at senior level. Saka's effort was saved by goalkeeper Gianluigi Donnarumma and, as a result, Italy won the shoot-out and the tournament. Saka faced racist abuse online after missing the penalty. On 15 July, Saka said in an Instagram post that he "knew instantly the kind of hate" he was going to receive after his penalty was saved, adding: "... and that is a sad reality that your powerful platforms are not doing enough to stop these messages."

On 23 September 2022, Saka was named England Men's Player of the Year for the 2021–22 season ahead of Declan Rice and Harry Kane, becoming the first Arsenal player to win the honour. Saka was named in England's 26-man squad for the 2022 FIFA World Cup on 10 November. He scored twice in a 6–2 victory over Iran on 21 November in England's opening match at the tournament.

Personal life
His favourite footballer of all-time is Thierry Henry and he cites Alexis Sánchez as an influence, saying he even tried to copy Sánchez's boots when he was an academy player. Among past teammates, Saka said David Luiz helped him the most in his career, saying "he went out of his way" to help a lot of Arsenal youngsters "on and off the pitch."

Saka is a committed Christian and has said that he reads the Bible every night.

Career statistics

Club

International

England score listed first, score column indicates score after each Saka goal

Honours
Arsenal
FA Cup: 2019–20
FA Community Shield: 2020
UEFA Europa League runner-up: 2018–19

England
UEFA European Championship runner-up: 2020

Individual
England Men's Player of the Year: 2021–22
Arsenal Player of the Season: 2020–21, 2021–22
IFFHS Men's Youth (U20) World Team: 2021
London Football Awards: Men's Young Player of the Year: 2023

References

External links

Profile at the Arsenal F.C. website
Profile at the Football Association website

2001 births
Living people
Footballers from Ealing
English footballers
Association football defenders
Association football midfielders
Association football wingers
Watford F.C. players
Arsenal F.C. players
Premier League players
England youth international footballers
England under-21 international footballers
England international footballers
UEFA Euro 2020 players
2022 FIFA World Cup players
Black British sportsmen
English sportspeople of Nigerian descent
English people of Yoruba descent
English Christians